Mycenae (or , Mykē̂nai or Mykḗnē) is an archaeological site near Mykines in Argolis, north-eastern Peloponnese, Greece.

In the second millennium BC, Mycenae was one of the major centres of Greek civilization, a military stronghold which dominated much of southern Greece, Crete, the Cyclades and parts of southwest Anatolia. The period of Greek history from about 1600 BC to about 1100 BC is called Mycenaean in reference to Mycenae. At its peak in 1350 BC, the citadel and lower town had a population of 30,000 and an area of 32 hectares.

The first correct identification of Mycenae in modern literature was in 1700, during a survey conducted by the Venetian engineer Francesco Vandeyk on behalf of Francesco Grimani, the Provveditore Generale of the Kingdom of the Morea. Vandeyk used Pausanias's description of the Lion Gate to identify the ruins of Mycenae.

In 1999, the archeological site of Mycenae was inscribed on the UNESCO World Heritage List, along with the nearby site of Tiryns, because of its historical importance as the center of the Mycenaean civilization, its outstanding architecture, and its testimony to the development of Ancient Greek civilization.

The Lions Gate, the Treasury of Atreus, and the walls of Tiryns are examples of the noteworthy architecture found in Mycenae and Tiryns. These discoveries' structures and layouts exemplify the human creative talent of the time. Greek architecture and urban planning have been significantly influenced by the Mycenaean civilization. Mycenae and Tiryn, which stand as the pinnacle of the early phases of Greek civilization, provided unique witness to political, social, and economic growth during the Mycenaean civilization. The accomplishments of the Mycenaean civilisation in art, architecture, and technology, which inspired European cultures, are also on display at both locations. 

These sites are strongly connected to the Homeric epics. The earliest examples of the Greek language are also visible at Mycenae and Tiryn, preserved on linear B tablets.
	
A stringent legal framework was established to safeguard the integrity of the Mycenae and Tiryns sites against vandalism and other forms of damage and disturbance to the remains. The Hellenic Ministry of Culture and Sports monitors the two archaeological sites. To maintain the quality and conditions of the Mycenaean and Tiryn sites, archaeological study is conducted methodically and systematically.

The Greek Antiquities Law No. 3028/2002, on the "Conservation of Antiquities and Cultural Heritage in General," governs the preservation and protection of the sites. Ministerial Decree No. 2160 of 1964 created and safeguarded the limits of Mycenae in addition to the sites themselves. The Acropolis and the larger surrounding surroundings are also covered by this ministerial decree's extension of protection. Ministerial Decrees No. 102098/4753 of 1956 and 12613/696 of 1991 both provide protection for the Tiryns archaeological site.

Etymology

The name Mukanai is thought not to be Greek but rather one of the many pre-Greek place names inherited by later Greek speakers. Legend has it that the name was connected to the Greek word mykēs (μύκης, "mushroom"). Thus, Pausanias ascribes the name to the legendary founder Perseus, who was said to have named it either after the cap (mykēs) of the sheath of his sword, or after a mushroom he had plucked on the site. Homer connected the name to the nymph Mycene the daughter of the river god Inachos of Argos (Odyssey 2.120).

The later form  (Μυκῆναι) was the result of a well-known sound change in Attic-Ionic which shifts some instances of ā to ē.

History

Neolithic Age
Situated in the north-east corner of the Argive plain, it easily overlooked the whole area and was ideally positioned to be a centre of power, especially as it commanded all easy routes to the Isthmus of Corinth. Besides its strong defensive and strategic position, it had good farmland and an adequate water supply. There are only faint traces of Neolithic settlement on the site although it was continuously occupied from the Early Neolithic (EN; c. 5000–c. 4000 BC) through the Early Helladic (EH; c. 3200–c. 2000 BC) and Middle Helladic (MH; c. 2000–c. 1550 BC) periods. EN Rainbow Ware constitutes the earliest ceramic evidence discovered so far.

Early and Middle Bronze Age
The population had grown considerably by the Middle Helladic. As elsewhere, a dominant Cretan influence prevailed from c. 1600 BC, the first evidence of this coming from the shaft graves discovered in 1876 by Heinrich Schliemann. Schliemann's shaft graves came to be known as Circle A to distinguish them from the Circle B graves which were found at a later date, although Circle B are the earlier graves dated c. 1650 BC to c. 1550 BC and entirely within MHIII. Circle A is dated to the sixteenth century BC, including the transition from Middle to Late Helladic IA (LHIA; c. 1550 – c. 1500 BC). The contents of Circle B are less wealthy than those of Circle A.

Pottery material spanning the entire Early Helladic was discovered 1877 by Panagiotis Stamatakis at a low depth in the sixth shaft grave in Circle A. Further EH and MH material was found beneath the walls and floors of the palace, on the summit of the acropolis, and outside the Lion Gate in the area of the ancient cemetery. An EH–MH settlement was discovered near a fresh-water well on top of the Kalkani hill south-west of the acropolis. The first burials in pits or cist graves manifest in MHII (c. 1800 BC) on the west slope of the acropolis, which was at least partially enclosed by the earliest circuit wall.

Late Bronze Age

In the absence of documents and objects that can be precisely dated, events at Mycenae can only be dated relatively within the constraints of Helladic chronology which relies on categorisation of stratified material objects, mainly pottery, within an agreed historical framework. Mycenae developed into a major power during LHI (c. 1550 – c. 1450 BC) and is believed to have become the main centre of Aegean civilisation through the fifteenth century to the extent that the two hundred years from c. 1400 BC to c. 1200 BC (encompassing LHIIIA and LHIIIB) are known as the Mycenaean Age. The Minoan hegemony was ended c. 1450 and there is evidence that Knossos was occupied by Mycenaeans until it too was destroyed c. 1370 BC. From then on, Mycenaean expansion throughout the Aegean was unhindered until the massive disruption of society in the first half of the twelfth century (LHIIIC) which ended Mycenaean civilisation and culminated in the destruction of Mycenae itself c. 1150 BC.

Late Helladic I (LHI; c. 1550–c. 1450 BC)
Outside the partial circuit wall, Grave Circle B, named for its enclosing wall, contained ten cist graves in Middle Helladic style and several shaft graves, sunk more deeply, with interments resting in cists. Richer grave goods mark the burials as possibly regal. Mounds over the top contained broken drinking vessels and bones from a repast, testifying to a more than ordinary farewell. Stelae surmounted the mounds.

A walled enclosure, Grave Circle A, included six more shaft graves, with nine female, eight male, and two juvenile interments. Grave goods were more costly than in Circle B. The presence of engraved and inlaid swords and daggers, with spear points and arrowheads, leave little doubt that warrior chieftains and their families were buried here. Some art objects obtained from the graves are the Silver Siege Rhyton, the Mask of Agamemnon, the Cup of Nestor, and weapons both votive and practical. The chemical compositions of the silver objects indicate that the silver was sourced from several locations.

Late Helladic II (LHII; c. 1450–c. 1400 BC)
Alan Wace divided the nine tholos tombs of Mycenae into three groups of three, each based on architecture. His earliest – the Cyclopean Tomb, Epano Phournos, and the Tomb of Aegisthus – are dated to LHIIA.

Burial in tholoi is seen as replacing burial in shaft graves. The care taken to preserve the shaft graves testifies that they were by then part of the royal heritage, the tombs of the ancestral heroes. Being more visible, the tholoi all had been plundered either in antiquity, or in later historic times.

Late Helladic III (LHIII; c. 1400–c. 1050 BC)
At a conventional date of 1350 BC, the fortifications on the acropolis, and other surrounding hills, were rebuilt in a style known as Cyclopean because the blocks of stone used were so massive that they were thought in later ages to be the work of the one-eyed giants known as the Cyclopes. Within these walls, much of which can still be seen, successive monumental palaces were built. The final palace, remains of which are currently visible on the acropolis of Mycenae, dates to the start of LHIIIA:2. Earlier palaces must have existed, but they had been cleared away or built over.

The construction of palaces at that time with a similar architecture was general throughout southern Greece. They all featured a megaron, or throne room, with a raised central hearth under an opening in the roof, which was supported by four columns in a square around the hearth. A throne was placed against the center of a wall to the side of the hearth, allowing an unobstructed view of the ruler from the entrance. Frescos adorned the plaster walls and floor.

The room was accessed from a courtyard with a columned portico. A grand staircase led from a terrace below to the courtyard on the acropolis.

In the temple built within the citadel, a scarab of Queen Tiye of Egypt, who was married to Amenhotep III, was placed in the Room of the Idols alongside at least one statue of either LHIIIA:2 or B:1 type. Amenhotep III's relations with m-w-k-i-n-u, *Mukana, have corroboration from the inscription at Kom al-Hetan - but Amenhotep's reign is thought to align with late LHIIIA:1. It is likely that Amenhotep's herald presented the scarab to an earlier generation, which then found the resources to rebuild the citadel as Cyclopean and then, to move the scarab here.

Wace's second group of tholoi are dated between LHIIA and LHIIIB: Kato Phournos, Panagia Tholos, and the Lion Tomb. The final group, Group III: the Treasury of Atreus, the Tomb of Clytemnestra and the Tomb of the Genii, are dated to LHIIIB by a sherd under the threshold of the Treasury of Atreus, the largest of the nine tombs. Like the Treasury of Minyas at Orchomenus the tomb had been looted of its contents and its nature as funerary monument had been forgotten. The structure bore the traditional name of "Treasury".

The pottery phases on which the relative dating scheme is based (EH, MH, LH, etc.) do not allow very precise dating, even augmented by the few existing C-14 dates due to the tolerance inherent in these. The sequence of further construction at Mycenae is approximately as follows. In the middle of LHIIIB, around 1250 BC or so, the Cyclopean wall was extended on the west slope to include Grave Circle A. The main entrance through the circuit wall was made grand by the best known feature of Mycenae, the Lion Gate, through which passed a stepped ramp leading past circle A and up to the palace. The Lion Gate was constructed in the form of a "Relieving Triangle" in order to support the weight of the stones. An undecorated postern gate also was constructed through the north wall.

One of the few groups of excavated houses in the city outside the walls lies beyond Grave Circle B and belongs to the same period. The House of Shields, the House of the Oil Merchant, the House of the Sphinxes, and the West House. These may have been both residences and workshops.

Citadel facts and figures  
Circuit length:  
Preserved height: up to  
Width: 7.5-17M 
Minimum stone required: 145,215 Cu.M or 14,420 average stones (10 tons) 
Time to move 1 Block using men: 2.125 days 
Time to move all Blocks using men: 110.52 years 
Time to move 1 Block using oxen: 0.125 days 
Time to move all Blocks using oxen: 9.9 years 
Based on 8-hour work day.

The largest stones including the lintels and gate jambs weighed well over 20 tonnes; some may have been close to 100 tonnes.

Somewhat later, toward the end of LHIIIB around 1200 BC, another, final extension to the citadel was undertaken. The wall was extended again on the northeast, with a sally port and also a secret passage through and under the wall, of corbeled construction, leading downward by some 99 steps to a cistern carved out of rock 15 m below the surface. It was fed by a tunnel from a spring on more distant higher ground.

Already in LHIIIA:1, Egypt knew *Mukana by name as a capital city on the level of Thebes and Knossos. During LHIIIB, Mycenae's political, military and economic influence likely extended as far as Crete, Pylos in the western Peloponnese, and to Athens and Thebes.

Decline

Mycenae was among the numerous Aegean sites destroyed as part of the Bronze Age Collapse around 1200 BC. The causes of these destructions are unknown, but proposed explanations include enemy attack, internal strife, and natural disasters such as earthquakes. Unlike many other sites, Mycenae was partly rebuilt after this destruction, though it was no longer the center of a centralized literate bureacuracy. Pottery finds suggest that Postpalatial Mycenae eventually regained some its wealth, before burning once again. After this period, the site remained sparsely populated until the Hellenistic era.

Archaic and classical periods
A temple dedicated to Hera was built on the summit of the Mycenaean citadel during the Archaic Period. A Mycenaean contingent fought at Thermopylae and Plataea during the Persian Wars. In 468 BC, however, troops from Argos captured Mycenae, expelled the inhabitants and razed the fortifications.

Revival and abandonment
Mycenae was briefly reoccupied in the Hellenistic period, when it could boast a theatre (located over the Tomb of Clytemnestra). The site was subsequently abandoned, and by the Roman period in Greece its ruins had become a tourist attraction. The Ministry of Culture, Education, and Religious Affairs is currently in charge of the site. In 1999, a scientific committee for Mycenae was created and numerous projects for the preservation, improvement, and stabilization of both archaeological sites have been completed by this scientific body. The committee also sought to improve visitor access to the monuments at the locations by laying out walkways and establishing informational stations. The ancient travel writer Pausanias, for example, visited the site and briefly described the prominent fortifications and the Lion Gate, still visible in his time, the second century AD. Pausanias also describes being led to the site by shepherds, showing that the surrounding area was never completely abandoned.

Political organization
It appears that the Mycenaean state was ruled by kings identified by the title , wa-na-ka ("wanax') in the Linear B inscriptions at Knossos and Pylos. Wanax had the supreme authority and was represented by  a number of officials.  In the Homeric poems, the word form is anax, often translated in English as "lord". Some inscriptions with a list of offerings indicate that the king was probably divine, but the term "for the king" is usually accompanied by another name. It is possible that a priest-king system  was adopted from the East  and the  title probably indicates that his right to rule was given by the god. The term , qa-si-re-u (cf. , "basileús"), which was later used in Greece for "king", was apparently used for the "chief" of any group of people, or for a provincial official. (Homer mentions many basilees in Ithaca).

The land possessed by the king is usually called , te-me-no ("témenos"), a word that survived in classical Greece (the temenos placed by Hephaestus on the shield of Achilles is called "royal"). In classical times the word has a religious connotation . Alternatively, he may have been the crown prince or, if one follows the argument of a single Mycenaean state, a local king who was a vassal to the overarching wanax / Great King. Leonard Robert Palmer suggests that the "telestai were the men of telos- the fief holders". The , e-qe-ta (ekwetai, "companions" or "followers") were a group of nobles (aristocrats), who followed the king in peace and war. It seems that they were representatives of the king among military groups and religious personnel. There is also at least one instance of a person, Enkhelyawon at Pylos, who appears titleless in the written record but whom modern scholars regard as being probably a king.

From the existing evidence, it seems that the kingdom was further subdivided into sixteen districts. It is possible that these represent koreter and prokoreter. The , da-mo-ko-ro (damokoros) was an official appointment but his duties are not very clear. Attic δῆμος, dễmos), or "plot holders". It seems that the da-mo was a collective body of men, representing the local district  and that it had certain power in public affairs. The land was held by the wanax, by the damos, and by individual land owners. It seems that people lived in small family groups or clans around the main cidadel. Occupying a lower rung of the social ladder were the slaves, do-e-ro, (cf. , doúlos). These are recorded in the texts as working either for the palace or for specific deities. 

Archaeological evidence supports the idea that the social hierarchy of Mycenae was a monarchy. The difference in the grave goods shows how the society was clearly separated by class. The king or the Wanax was at the top of the hierarchy, who lived in the palaces and made laws for the people. It is believed that the kings came into power not because of great leadership duties, but because of hereditary succession. Below the king was the Lawagetas, believed to be the leader of the army, based on Homer's works. The Lawagetas are thought to have gotten their power by owning the most land. Other opinions think Lawagetas were a sort of prince, having no military power. Under the Lawagetas are numerous craftsmen employed by the Lawagetas. Other groups commonly mentioned in landholding texts are the Telestas. Some think the Telestas are religious officials while others believe they were given land in return for services. Under the Telestas is believed to be the Hequetia, who are believed to be either military workers or warriors or companions of the king. Under the Hequetia are the general laborers which includes artisans, farmers, fisherman, and more. At the bottom of the social hierarchy slaves, which are commonly believed to be women. Even when women were not slaves it is believed they were never able to hold substantial roles of power in the civilizations. The particular positions held and responsibilities performed within Mycenae's social structure are not well understood. 

According to the traditional  view, Mycenae or any other palatial center of mainland Greece was not an empire, and the mainland consisted of independent city-states. This view has in recent years, however, been challenged by various specialists, such as Jorrit Kelder and, most recently, Birgitta Eder and Reinhard Jung. Kelder pointed out that a number of palaces and fortifications appear to be part of a wider kingdom. For instance, Gla, located in the region of Boeotia, belonged to the state of nearby Orchomenos. The palace of Mycenae probably ruled over a territory two to three times the size of the other palatial states in Bronze Age Greece. Its territory would have also included adjacent centers, including Tiryns and Nauplion, which could plausibly be ruled by a member of Mycenae's ruling dynasty.  Certain archaeological features in the palatial centers like the architectural uniformity, the uniformity of the administrative system, the uniformity in pottery, the imperial language and some large scale projects (drainage systems, harbours, roads etc.) indicate that large parts of Greece may have fallen under the sway of a single king, with various degrees of control over local vassals: a situation not dissimilar from the contemporary Hittite world, although the archaeological evidence remains ambiguous. A loose confederacy of city-states under the king of Mycenae, Agamemnon, is mentioned by Homer in Iliad.

Religion

Much of the Mycenaean religion survived into classical Greece in their pantheon of Greek deities, but it is not known to what extent Greek religious belief is Mycenaean, nor how much is a product of the Greek Dark Ages or later. Moses I. Finley detected only few authentic Mycenaean beliefs in the 8th-century Homeric world, but Nilsson suggested that the Mycenaean religion was the mother of the Greek religion.

From the history traced by Nilsson and Guthrie, the Mycenaean pantheon consisted of Minoan deities, but also of gods and goddesses who appear under different names with similar functions in East and West. Many of these names appearing in the Linear B inscriptions can be found later in classical Greece like Zeus, Hera, Poseidon, Athena, Hermes, Eileithyia and Dionysos, but the etymology is the only evidence of the cults.

There are several reasonable guesses that can be made, however. It seems that originally the Mycenaeans, like many Indo-Europeans, considered divine any object that inherited an internal power (anima). Certain religious beliefs were mixed with the beliefs of the local populations as it appears in the old cults of isolated Arcadia, which survived up to classical Greece. In these cults, Poseidon appears usually as a horse, representing the river spirit of the underworld as it usually happens in northern-European folklore. The precursor goddesses of Demeter and Persephone are closely related with the springs and the animals, and especially with Poseidon and Artemis who was the first nymph. Mycenaean religion was almost certainly polytheistic, and the Mycenaeans were actively syncretistic, adding foreign deities to their pantheon of deities with considerable ease. The Mycenaeans probably entered Greece with a pantheon of deities headed by some ruling sky-deity, which linguists speculate might have been called *Dyeus in early Indo-European. In Greek, this deity would become Zeus (pronounced Zeus or Dias in ancient Greek). Among the Hindus, this sky-deity becomes "Dyaus Pita". In Latin he becomes "deus pater" or Jupiter; we still encounter this word in the etymologies of the words "deity" and "divine".

Later in some cults, Zeus is united with the Aegean Great Goddess, who is represented by Hera in a "holy wedding" (hieros gamos). At some point in their cultural history, the Mycenaeans adopted some Minoan goddesses like Aphaea, Britomartis, Diktynna and associated them with their sky-god. Many of them were absorbed by more powerful divinities, and some like the vegetation goddesses Ariadne and Helen survived in Greek folklore together with the cult of the "divine child", who was probably the precursor of Dionysos. Athena and Hera survived and were tutelary goddesses, the guardians of the palaces and the cities. In general, later Greek religion distinguishes between two types of deities: the Olympian, or sky deities (including Zeus), which are now commonly known in some form or another; and, the chthonic deities, or deities of the earth. Walter Burkert warns: "To what extent one can and must differentiate between Minoan and Mycenaean religion is a question which has not yet found a conclusive answer." He suggests that useful parallels will be found in the relations between Hellenistic and Archaic Greek culture and religion, or between Roman and Etruscan culture.

The pantheon also included deities representing the powers of nature and wildlife, who appear with similar functions in the Mediterranean region. The "Mistress of the Animals" (Potnia Theron), later called Artemis, may be identified as the Minoan goddess Britomartis/Dictynna. Poseidon is the lord of the sea, and therefore of storms and earthquakes, (the "Earth shaker" in Linear B tablets). He may have functioned as a pre-Hellenic chthonic Zeus, the lord or spouse of the Earth goddess. Athena whose task was to protect the olive-trees is a civic Artemis. The powers of animal nature fostered a belief in nymphs whose existence was bound to the trees and the waters, and in gods with human forms and the heads or tails of animals who stood for primitive bodily instincts. In Arcadia were depicted animal-headed gods, indicating that in the remote past the gods were conceived as animals and birds, in a surrounding of animal-headed daemons. Later the gods were revealed in human forms with an animal as a companion or symbol. Some of the old gods survived in the cult of Dionysos (Satyrs) and Pan (the goat-god).

The Mycenaeans adopted probably from the east a priest-king system and the belief of a ruling deity in the hands of a theocratic society. At the end of the second millennium BC, when the Mycenaean palaces collapsed, it seems that Greek thought was gradually released from the idea that each man was a servant to the gods, and sought a "moral purpose". It is possible that this procedure started before the end of the Mycenaean age, but the idea is almost absent or vague in the Homeric poems, where the interference of the gods is not related to the rightness or wrongness of men's actions. Later, Hesiod uses a lot of eastern material in his cosmology and in the genealogical trees of the gods, and he introduces the idea of the existence of something else behind the gods, which was more powerful than they.

The Olympian Pantheon is an ordered system. The Greek divinities live with Zeus at the helm and each is concerned with a recognizable sphere. However, certain elements in some Greek cults indicate the survival of some older cults from a less rationalized world: old cults of the dead, agrarian magic, exorcism of evil spirits, peculiar sacrifices, and animal-headed gods. In the Homeric poems, the avenging Fate was probably originally a daemon acting in parallel with the gods. Later, the cult of Dionysos Zagreus indicates that life-blood of animals was needed to renew that of men. A similar belief may be guessed from the Mycenaean Hagia Triada sarcophagus (1400 BC), which combines features of Minoan civilization and Mycenaean style. It seems that the blood of a bull was used for the regeneration of the reappearing dead. Probably most of these cults existed in the Mycenaean period and survived by immemorial practice.

A secondary level of importance was the cult of the heroes, which seems to have started in the Mycenaean era. These were great men of the past who were exalted to honor after death, because of what they had done. According to an old Minoan belief, beyond the sea there was an island called Elysion, where the departed could have a different but happier existence. Later, the Greeks believed that there could live in human form only heroes and the beloved of the gods. The souls of the rest would drift unconsciously in the gloomy space of Hades. Gods and men had common origins, but there was an enormous gap between the immortal gods and mortal men. However, certain elements indicate that the Mycenaeans probably believed in a future existence. Two well-preserved bodies were found in Shaft Grave VI, and Wolfgang Helbig believed that an embalming preceded the burial. In the shaft graves discovered by Heinrich Schliemann, the corpses were lightly exposed to fire in order to preserve them.

Mycenaean religion certainly involved offerings and sacrifices to the deities, and some have speculated that their ceremonies involved human sacrifice based on textual evidence and bones found outside tombs. In the Homeric poems, there seems to be a lingering cultural memory of human sacrifice in King Agamemnon's sacrifice of his daughter, Iphigenia; several of the stories of Trojan heroes involve tragic human sacrifice. In the far past, even human beings might be offered to placate inscrutable gods, especially in times of guilty fear. Later sacrifice became a feast at which oxen were slaughtered. Men kept the meat, and gave the gods the bones wrapped in fat.

Beyond this speculation we can go no further. Somewhere in the shades of the centuries between the fall of the Mycenaean civilization and the end of the Greek Dark Ages, the original Mycenaean religion persisted and adapted until it finally emerged in the stories of human devotion, apostasy, and divine capriciousness that exists in the two great epic poems of Homer.

Mycenae in Greek mythology and legends

Perseid dynasty

Classical Greek myths assert that Mycenae was founded by Perseus, grandson of king Acrisius of Argos, son of Acrisius's daughter, Danaë and the god Zeus. Having killed his grandfather by accident, Perseus could not, or would not, inherit the throne of Argos. Instead he arranged an exchange of realms with his cousin, Megapenthes, and became king of Tiryns, Megapenthes taking Argos. After that, he founded Mycenae and ruled the kingdoms jointly from there.

Perseus married Andromeda and had many sons. His son, Electryon, became the second of the dynasty, but the succession was disputed by the Taphians under Pterelaos, another Perseid, who assaulted Mycenae, lost, and retreated with the cattle. The cattle were recovered by Amphitryon, a grandson of Perseus, but he killed his uncle by accident with a club in an unruly cattle incident and had to go into exile.

The throne went to Sthenelus, third in the dynasty, a son of Perseus. He set the stage for future greatness by marrying Nicippe, a daughter of King Pelops of Elis, the most powerful state of the region and the times. With her he had a son, Eurystheus, the fourth and last of the Perseid dynasty. When a son of Heracles, Hyllus, killed Sthenelus, Eurystheus became noted for his enmity to Heracles and for his ruthless persecution of the Heracleidae, the descendants of Heracles.

This is the first we hear in legend of those noted sons, who became a symbol of the Dorians. Heracles had been a Perseid. After his death, Eurystheus determined to annihilate these rivals for the throne of Mycenae, but they took refuge in Athens, and in the course of war, Eurystheus and all his sons were killed. The Perseid dynasty came to an end and the people of Mycenae placed Eurystheus's maternal uncle, Atreus, a Pelopid, on the throne.

Atreid dynasty
The people of Mycenae had received advice from an oracle that they should choose a new king from among the Pelopids. The two contenders were Atreus and his brother, Thyestes. The latter was chosen at first. At this moment nature intervened and the sun appeared to reverse direction by setting in the east. Atreus argued that because the sun had reversed its path, the election of Thyestes should be reversed. The argument was heeded, and Atreus became king. His first move was to pursue Thyestes and all his family – that is, his own kin – but Thyestes managed to escape from Mycenae.

In legend, Atreus had two sons, Agamemnon and Menelaus, the Atreids. Aegisthus, the son of Thyestes, killed Atreus and restored Thyestes to the throne. With the help of King Tyndareus of Sparta, the Atreids drove Thyestes again into exile. Tyndareus had two ill-starred daughters, Helen and Clytemnestra, whom Menelaus and Agamemnon married, respectively. Agamemnon inherited Mycenae and Menelaus became king of Sparta.

Homeric Poems
Soon, Helen eloped with Paris of Troy. Agamemnon conducted a 10-year war against Troy to get her back for his brother. Because of lack of wind, the warships could not sail to Troy. In order to please the gods so that they might make the winds start to blow, Agamemnon sacrificed his daughter Iphigenia. According to some versions of the legend, the hunting goddess Artemis replaced her at the very last moment with a deer on the altar, and took Iphigenia to Tauris (see Iphigenia in Tauris by Euripides). The deities, having been satisfied by such a sacrifice, made the winds blow and the Greek fleet departed.

Legend tells us that the long and arduous Trojan War, although nominally a Greek victory, brought anarchy, piracy, and ruin; already before the Greek fleet set sail for Troy, the conflict had divided the gods as well, and this contributed to curses and acts of vengeance following many of the Greek heroes. After the war Agamemnon returned to Mycenae and was greeted royally with a red carpet rolled out for him. Shortly thereafter, he was slain by Clytemnestra, who hated him bitterly for having ordered the sacrifice of their daughter Iphigenia in order to gain favorable winds to Troy. Clytemnestra was aided in her crime by Aegistheus, her lover, who reigned subsequently, but Orestes, her son by Agamemnon, was smuggled out to Phocis. He returned as an adult with his sister Electra to slay Clytemnestra and Aegistheus. He then fled to Athens to evade justice and a matricide, and became insane for a time. Meanwhile, the throne of Mycenae went to Aletes, son of Aegistheus, but not for long. Recovering, Orestes returned to Mycenae with Electra to kill Aletes and took the throne. This story is told in numerous plays, including the Oresteia, Sophocles' Electra, and Euripides' Electra.

End of the Atreids
Orestes then built a larger state in the Peloponnese, but he died in Arcadia from a snake bite. His son, Tisamenus, the last of the Atreid dynasty, was killed by the Heracleidae on their return to the Peloponnesus. They claimed the right of the Perseids to inherit the various kingdoms of the Peloponnese and cast lots for the dominion of them, thus leaving the Atreids as the final rulers of Legendary Mycenae.

Modern history and excavation

The site of Mycenae appears to have been abandoned after its short-lived Hellenistic resettlement. By the time of Pausanias' visit in the second century CE, he described the site as a 'ruin', though noted that parts of the walls and the Lion Gate could still be seen. Grave Circle A, meanwhile, was already buried in prehistoric times, and is unlikely to have been visible to Pausanias. The site may still have been visible in the 5th century CE, when it was correctly located on the Roman map known as the Tabula Peutingeriana, but the location seems to have been forgotten during the medieval period: it was generally misplaced on fifteenth-century maps, and Cyriac of Ancona, who believed he visited the site in 1447/1448, had actually seen the nearby fort of Katsingri. Similarly, modern scholarship has disproved the claims of two sixteenth-century travellers to have visited the site: André de Monceaux, who claimed to have visited the site in 1669, and the French military officer Nicola Mirabel, who believed that he had done so in 1691.

Early archaeological work (1700–1876)

In 1700, the Venetian engineer Francesco Vandeyk made the first known correct identification of Mycenae of modern times while surveying the Peloponnese (known to the Venetians as the 'Morea') under the orders of Francesco Grimani, Provveditore of the Venetian armies occupying the region. Vandeyk partially dismantled the debris that was then obscuring the Lion Gate, and identified the tomb now known as the 'Treasury of Atreus', even conjecturing that it was the tomb of a king of Mycenae. During the 18th century, Mycenae was visited only infrequently by tourists, such as the Frenchman Claude-Louis Fourmont, who visited Mycenae in 1729–1730 and drew parts of the walls and gates. From 1796, however, Napoleon's invasion of Italy encouraged members of the Society of Dilettanti, whose 'Grand Tour' normally took place in Italy, to find alternative destinations, and members of the society began to include Mycenae on their itineraries: seeing it, in the words of Cathy Gere, as 'the ultimate Romantic ruin.'

In the early 19th century, local tradition held that the Treasury of Atreus had been once explored by the agha of the nearby village of Karvati, who took from it a bronze lamp. By this period, more of Mycenae's monuments were visible and known to European visitors. In 1802, the British aristocrat Thomas Bruce, 7th Earl of Elgin visited Mycenae looking for antiquities that might be taken back to Britain. While he had originally sought to remove the sculpted relief of the Lion Gate, it proved too large to lift or transport, and so Elgin asked the voivode of Nafplio to clear the Treasury of Atreus, from which he removed fragments of pottery vases, ornamental stonework and a marble vase, as well as parts of its sculptural decoration. In June 1810, Veli Pasha, the Ottoman Pasha of the Morea, excavated the tomb, clearing most of the entrance, and entered the chamber with ladders; according to Heinrich Schliemann's later publication of his own excavations at Mycenae, he discovered 'bones covered with gold', as well as gemstones and other gold and silver objects. Veli Pasha removed four large fragments of the semi-engaged columns beside the doorway, some of which he gave as a gift to Howe Browne, 2nd Marquess of Sligo, who visited him shortly after the excavations. 

In 1834, the site was surveyed and mapped by French troops. In 1841, Kyriakos Pittakis, working on behalf of the Archaeological Society of Athens, cleared the approach to the Lion Gate and made a tentative exploration of the Tomb of Clytemnestra.

Schliemann's excavations (1874–1876)

One archaeologist obsessed over this area for discovery in particular, named Heinrich Schliemann. From the time Schliemann was a young boy, he had the dream to one day discover the city of Troy, also the site of the Trojan war. Schliemann’s obsession began as a very young boy when his father would read him passages from Homer's epics, The Iliad and Odyssey. As Schliemann grew older, his dreams became a reality, in 1871 Schliemann began his excavations on the hill Hissarlik, located in Turkey. Schliemann worked for over three years before finding deposits of gold and silver, which has since been referred to as “King Priam’s Treasure”. In 1876 Schliemann began excavating in Greece and soon discovered a gold mask that he labeled as “The Mask of Agamemnon”. Agamemnon was a very important figure in Greek mythology. It is believed that Agamemnon was the king of Mycenae and led the Greek army in the Trojan war. Although there is no historical evidence of a Myceanaean King called Agamemnon, it is supported by archaeological evidence.Years after the initial discovery of the mask, Schliemann’s claims were refuted because the mask that was originally believed to be “The Mask of Agamemnon” is dated up to 400 years before Agamemnon is even thought to have existed, as well as the chronological events of the Trojan war. Although Schliemann made monumental discoveries his works are criticized and some critics claim Schliemann destroyed more history than he uncovered. Others call Schliemann “the father of scientific archaeology”. Overall, opinions of Schliemann’s works are mixed. 

Schliemann's prior claims of findings that have since been proven false are one reason why he is frequently questioned. The descriptions of Schliemann's initial discoveries of Troy in his own diaries are hazy, and the dates he gives for when they were made are sometimes incongruous. Following his work at Troy, Schliemann carried out excavations throughout Greece, which led to the discovery of Grave shaft A in Mycenae. The infamous "Mask of Agamemnon," according to many critics, wasn't truly discovered in these grave shafts. The two tomb shafts appear to include a wide variety of funeral masks in addition to the already debunked claims concerning the mask. In one form of mask, there were no smiles or facial hairs; in another, the mask had a more bowl-like shape and smiles were apparent; and in the last style, "The Mask of Agamemnon," there were smiles, facial hair, and detachable, intricate ears. Some critics contend that Schliemann smuggled additional artifacts into Mycenae and then falsely claimed to have discovered them. Schliemann was previously known to smuggle artifacts out of Hisarlik.

In 1874, Heinrich Schliemann excavated deep shafts all over the acropolis without permission; in August 1876, a complete excavation of the site by Schliemann commenced with the permission of the Archaeological Society of Athens (ASA) and the supervision of one of its members, Panayiotis Stamatakis. Schliemann believed in the historical truth of the Homeric stories and interpreted the site accordingly. He found the ancient shaft graves with their royal skeletons and spectacular grave goods. Upon discovering a human skull beneath a gold death mask in one of the tombs, he declared: "I have gazed upon the face of Agamemnon".

Excavations since Schliemann (1876–present)

Since Schliemann's day, more scientific excavations have taken place at Mycenae, mainly by Greek archaeologists but also by the British School at Athens. Christos Tsountas, another member of the ASA, cleared a significant portion of the citadel during his excavations of the site beginning in 1884 and ending in 1902. The Athens Archaeological Society is currently excavating the Mycenae Lower Town, with support from Dickinson College and the Institute for Aegean Prehistory. Afterwards, Tsountas and the ASA gave permission to the British School of Archaeology (BSA) to excavate; the BSA conducted excavations from 1920 to 1955 under the supervision of Alan John Bayard Wace, assisted by Winifred Lamb. In 1951, workers discovered Grave Circle B. After Wace died in 1957, excavation work was finished by Lord William Taylour from 1958 to 1969, especially on the west slope of the citadel. The ASA continued excavation work on the site with efforts led by Ioannis Papadimitriou and Nicolas Verdelis in the late 1950s and early 1960s, as well as by George Mylonas from 1957 up until 1985. In 1985, excavation work was directed by Spyros Iakovidis who, is still overseeing the ASA's research mission in both fieldwork and publication preparation.

See also
List of ancient Greek cities
Boar's tusk helmet
Fortification of Mycenae
Gold Grave Goods at Grave Circles A and B
National Archaeological Museum of Athens

Footnotes

Explanatory notes

Citations

Bibliography

Further reading

External links

Dickinson College Excavations at Mycenae
Mycenae: Research and Publication

 
Aegean palaces of the Bronze Age
Buildings and structures in Argolis
Former populated places in Greece
Locations in the Iliad
Populated places in ancient Argolis
Mycenaean palaces
Mycenaean sites in Argolis
Tourist attractions in Peloponnese (region)
World Heritage Sites in Greece
Late Bronze Age collapse
Former kingdoms